Cardston-Siksika is a new provincial electoral district in Alberta, Canada. The district was one of 87 districts mandated to return a single member (MLA) to the Legislative Assembly of Alberta using the first past the post method of voting. It was contested for the first time in the 2019 Alberta election.

Geography
The district is located in southern Alberta, stretching from Namaka (east of Calgary) to the border with Montana. It contains all of Vulcan County, the northern portions of Lethbridge County and MD of Taber which includes Vauxhall and Hays, and all of Cardston County, as well as the Treaty 7 reserves of the Kainai and Siksika nations.

History

The district was created in 2017 when the Electoral Boundaries Commission recommended reducing the number of districts in southern Alberta due to relatively slow population growth. The creation of "Cardston/Siksika", was the final boundary change for the new riding.  The first suggestion of the Boundary Commission was the "Taber/Vulcan" riding which extended from north of Vulcan to the Canada/U.S border, east to the Alberta/Saskatchewan border, north to Medicine Hat and west to the Bow River.  Little Bow MLA Dave Schneider presented at all Boundary Commission meetings that Taber/Vulcan was much too large. The final review resulted in a change of the boundaries of the proposed riding to the present "Cardston/Siksika" riding.

Electoral results

2010s

References

Alberta provincial electoral districts